Muztagh may refer to:

The Greater Karakoram ranges
Baltoro Muztagh
Batura Muztagh
Hispar Muztagh
Panmah Muztagh
Rimo Muztagh
Saser Muztagh
Siachen Muztagh

Two mountain passes in the Karakoram, the western and the eastern
Mustagh Passes in the Baltoro Muztagh

The Mountains
Muztagh Ata in the Pamir Mountains
Muztagh Tower in the Baltoro Muztagh
Ulugh Muztagh in the Kunlun Mountains